Chitnahalli Udayashankar (18 February 1934 – 2 July 1993; born in Chitnahalli) was an Indian lyricist and dialogue writer in the Kannada film industry for over three decades, who penned more than 3000 songs for films and devotional songs. His dialogues, screenplay and lyrics were instrumental in the success of many movies of Rajkumar. Udayashankar received four Karnataka State Film Award for Best Dialogue and two Karnataka State Film Award for Best Screenplay. He was the son of lyricist Chi. Sadashivaiah. His son Chi. Guru Dutt is an actor and director in Kannada and Tamil feature films.

Career 
In 1963, Chi Udayshankar wrote dialogues for the first time. This was for the film Santa Tukaram starring Rajkumar. He co-wrote dialogues and lyrics for many Kannada movies. He worked with his father in his early career. He directed the movie Manku Dinne in 1968. He supplied a great deal of dialogues and lyrics for manyRajkumar movies. He worked with Rajkumar from 1963 to 1993 in 92 movies. He also acted in movies like Haalu Jenu, Nee Nanna Gellalare, Halli Rambhe Belli Bombe and Anand.

Style 
Chi Udayashakar used to write his lyrics in simple and easily understood words. He was given the title 'Sahithya Rathna' (gem of literature) for his work.

Filmography 

{| class="wikitable sortable" autoNumber=true
|-
! Year !! Film title !! Remarks
|-
| 1963 || Santha Thukaram || Dialogue
|-
| 1965 || Mahasathi Anasuya || Dialogue
|-
| 1965 || Sathi Savithri || Lyrics for 2 songs, others penned by R N Jayagopal 3 Chi Sadashivaiah 2
|-
| 1966 || Bala Nagamm''' || Screenplay, Dialogue and Lyrics co-wrote with his father Chi Sadashivaiah
|-
| 1967 || Lagna Pathrike || Story, Screenplay, Dialogue and Lyrics
|-
| 1967 || Bangarada Hoovu || Dialogue and Lyrics. He co-wrote lyrics with Vijaya Narasimha
|-
| 1968 ||  Bhagyada Bagilu || Dialogue and Lyrics
|-
| 1968 ||  Simha Swapna || Dialogue and Lyrics
|-
| 1968 ||  Rowdy Ranganna || Dialogue and Lyrics
|-
| 1968 ||  Gandhinagara || Dialogue and Lyrics
|-
| 1968 ||  Bangalore Mail || Dialogue and Lyrics
|-
| 1968 ||  Nata Sarvabhauma || Dialogue and Lyrics
|-
| 1969 ||  Choori Chikkanna || Dialogue and Lyrics
|-
| 1969 ||  Operation Jackpot Nalli C.I.D 999 || Lyrics
|-
| 1969 ||  Uyyale  || Lyrics for one song. Other 4 penned by R N Jayagopal, Vijaya Narasimha, Geethapriya
|-
| 1969 ||  Mayor Muthanna || Dialogue and Lyrics
|-
| 1970 ||  Bhale Jodi || Dialogue and Lyrics for 3 songs. Other 2 penned by R N Jayagopal
|-
| 1970 ||  Baalu Belagithu || Dialogue and Lyrics for 3 songs. Other 1 penned by Vijaya Narasimha
|-
| 1970 ||  Mr. Rajkumar || Dialogue and Lyrics.
|-
| 1970 ||  CID Rajanna || Dialogue and Lyrics.
|-
| 1970 ||  Devara Makkalu || Dialogue and Lyrics for 1 song.  Other 3 penned by Vijaya Narasimha and Ugranarasimha
|-
| 1970 ||  Paropakari || Dialogue and Lyrics for 2 songs. Other 3 penned by R N Jayagopal
|-
| 1971 ||  Kasturi Nivasa || Dialogue and Lyrics for 3 songs. Other 3 penned by R N Jayagopal 2 and Vijaya Narasimha 1
|-
| 1971 ||  Bala Bandhana || Lyrics for 1 song
|-
| 1971 ||  Kula Gourava || Dialogue and Lyrics for 2 songs, Others 4 penned by R N Jayagopal 3 and Vijaya Narasimha 1
|-
| 1971 ||  Prathidhwani || Dialogue and Lyrics
|-
| 1971 ||  Namma Samsara || Dialogue and Lyrics for 2 songs. Others 2 written by R N Jayagopal
|-
| 1971 ||  Thayi Devaru || Dialogue and Lyrics
|-
| 1971 || Bhale Bhaskar ||Dialogues
|-
| 1971 ||  Sri Krishna Rukmini Sathyabhama || Dialogue and Lyrics co-wrote with Chi Sadashivaiah
|-
| 1972 ||  Hrudaya Sangama || Lyrics for 1 song.
|-
| 1972 ||  Bhale Huchcha || Story, Screenplay, Dialogue and Lyrics for 1 song. Other 3 written by Vijaya Narasimha 2 and Hunsur Krishnamurthy 1
|-
| 1972 ||  Bangarada Manushya || Lyrics for 1 song.
|-
| 1972 ||  Nyayave Devaru || Dialogue and Lyrics
|-
| 1972 ||  Kranthi Veera || Dialogue and Lyrics
|-
| 1972 ||  Nanda Gokula || Story, Dialogue and Lyrics for 2 songs
|-
| 1973 ||  Devaru Kotta Thangi || Dialogue and Lyrics for 2 songs.
|-
| 1973 ||  Bidugade || Dialogue and Lyrics
|-
| 1973 ||  Doorada Betta || Dialogue and Lyrics for 1 song.
|-
| 1973 ||  Gandhada Gudi || Dialogue and Lyrics
|-
| 1973 ||  Bangaarada Panjara || Dialogue and Lyrics
|-
| 1973 ||  Swayamvara || Lyrics for 1 song
|-
| 1973 ||  Mooruvare Vajragalu || Screenplay, Dialogue and Lyrics
|-
| 1974 || Sampathige Saval  || Screenplay, Dialogue and Lyrics for 3 songs, other 1 penned by R N Jayagopal
|-
| 1974 ||  Sri Srinivasa Kalyana || Screenplay, Dialogue and Lyrics for 8 songs, other 4 penned by Chi Sadashivaiah
|-
| 1974 ||  Eradu Kanasu || Dialogue and Lyrics
|-
| 1975 ||  Mayura || Dialogue and Lyrics
|-
| 1975 ||  Thrimurthy || Dialogue and Lyrics
|-
| 1975 ||  Daari Tappida Maga || Story, Dialogue and Lyrics
|-
| 1976 ||  Premada Kanike || Screenplay, Dialogue and Lyrics for 4 songs. Rest 2 penned by Vijaya Narasimha
|-
| 1976 ||  Bahaddur Gandu || Screenplay, Dialogue and Lyrics
|-
| 1976 ||  Naa Ninna Mareyalare || Dialogue and Lyrics
|-
| 1976 ||  Raja Nanna Raja || Screenplay, Dialogue and Lyrics
|-
| 1977 ||  Badavara Bandhu || Screenplay, Dialogue and Lyrics
|-
| 1977 ||  Olavu Geluvu || Dialogue and Lyrics
|-
| 1977 ||  Bhagyavantharu || Dialogue and Lyrics
|-
| 1977 ||  Sanaadi Appanna || Screenplay, Dialogue and Lyrics
|-
| 1977 ||  Babruvahana ||  Lyrics for 3 songs
|-
| 1977 ||  Giri Kanye ||Dialogues &  Lyrics
|-
| 1978 ||  Shankar Guru || Dialogue and Lyrics
|-
| 1978 || Thayige Thakka Maga || Dialogue and Lyrics
|-
| 1978 ||  Operation Diamond Racket || Dialogue and Lyrics
|-
| 1979 ||  Huliya Haalina Mevu || Screenplay, Dialogue and Lyrics
|-
| 1979 ||  Nanobba Kalla || Dialogue and Lyrics
|-
| 1980 ||  Ravi Chandra || Dialogue and Lyrics
|-
| 1980 ||  Vasantha Geetha || Dialogue and Lyrics
|-
| 1980 || Narada Vijaya || Dialogue and Lyrics
|-
| 1980 || Auto_Raja_(1980_film) || Lyrics
|-
| 1981 ||  Havina Hede || Dialogue and Lyrics
|-
| 1981 ||  Bhagyavantha || Dialogue and Lyrics
|-
| 1981 ||  Nee Nanna Gellalare || Dialogue and Lyrics
|-
| 1981 ||  Keralida Simha || Dialogue and Lyrics
|-
| 1982 ||  Hosa Belaku || Dialogue and Lyrics for 5 songs. 1 song is from Kuvempu used here.
|-
| 1982 ||  Haalu Jenu || Dialogue and Lyrics
|-
| 1982 || Baadada Hoo || Lyrics only
|-
| 1982 || Nanna Devaru || Lyrics only
|-
| 1982 ||  Chalisuva Modagalu || Dialogue and Lyrics
|-
| 1982 || Mullina Gulabi || Dialogue and Lyrics
|-
| 1983 ||  Kaviratna Kalidasa || Dialogue and Lyrics
|-
| 1983 ||  Bhakta Prahlada || Screenplay, Dialogue and Lyrics
|-
| 1983 ||  Eradu Nakshatragalu || Dialogue and Lyrics
|-
| 1983 ||  Samayada Gombe || Dialogue and Lyrics
|-
| 1983 ||  Kaamana Billu || Screenplay, Dialogue and Lyrics for 4 songs, other 1 from Kuvempu
|-
| 1983 ||  Shravana Banthu || Screenplay co-wrote with Singeetham Srinivasa Rao, Dialogue and Lyrics
|-
| 1984 ||  Apoorva Sangama || Lyrics
|-
| 1984 ||  Yarivanu || Screenplay, Dialogue and Lyrics
|-
| 1984 || Olavu Moodidaga || Dialogue and Lyrics
|-
| 1978 || Sneha Sedu ||Dialogues
|-
| 1985 ||  Dhruva Thare || Screenplay, Dialogue and Lyrics
|-
| 1985 ||  Ade Kannu || Screenplay, Dialogue and Lyrics
|-
| 1985 ||  Jwalamukhi || Screenplay co-wrote with Singeetham Srinivasa Rao, Dialogue and Lyrics
|-
| 1985 || Thayi Thande ||Dialogues
|-
| 1986 ||  Bhagyada Lakshmi Baramma || Screenplay with Singeetham Srinivasa Rao, Dialogue and Lyrics
|-
| 1986 ||  Anuraga Aralithu || Screenplay, Dialogue and Lyrics
|-
| 1986 ||  Guri || Dialogue and Lyrics
|-
| 1987 ||  Ondu Muttina Kathe || Dialogue and Lyrics
|-
| 1987 ||  Shruthi Seridaga || Screenplay with Singeetham Srinivasa Rao, Dialogue and Lyrics
|-
| 1987 || Karunamayi || Lyrics
|-
| 1988 ||  Shiva Mecchida Kannappa || Dialogue and Lyrics
|-
| 1988 ||  Devatha Manushya || Screenplay co-wrote with Singeetham Srinivasa Rao, Dialogue and Lyrics
|-
| 1989 ||  Parashuram || Dialogue and Lyrics for 2 songs. Other 3 songs penned by Hamsalekha 2 and T P Kailasam 1
|-
| 1989 ||Nanjundi Kalyana ||Script
|-
| 1991 || Halli Rambhe Belli Bombe || Dialogue, Lyrics and actor
|-
| 1991 || Gandu Sidigundu || Dialogue and Lyrics
|-
| 1992 ||  Jeevana Chaitra || Screenplay, Dialogue and Lyrics for 4 songs. Other 2 songs penned by K S Narasimhaswamy 1 and Mugur Mallappa
|-
| 1992 || Ksheera Sagara || Dialogue and Lyrics
|-
| 1992 ||  Aakasmika || Dialogue
|-
| 1993 ||  Gadibidi Ganda || Dialogue
|-
| 1993 || Roopayi Raja ||Screenplay
|-
| 1993 ||Jaga Mecchida Huduga ||Screenplay, dialogues
|-
| 1993 ||Apoorva Jodi ||Story, screenplay and dialogues
|-
| 1993 ||Ananda Jyothi ||Screenplay, dialogues
|-
| 1993 ||Vasantha Poornima ||Screenplay dialogues
|-
| 1994 ||  Odahuttidavaru || Screenplay, Dialogue and Lyrics for 1 song. Rest of each one song penned by Vijaya Narasimha, M N Vyasa Rao, Hamsalekha, Sri Ranga and Geethapriya
|-
| 1994 || Gandhada Gudi Part 2 || Dialogues and lyrics
|-
|}

 Awards 
Karnataka State Film Awards
 1970–71 – Karnataka State Film Award for Best Dialogue – Kula Gourava 1972–73 – Karnataka State Film Award for Best Dialogue – Naagarahaavu 1975–76 – Karnataka State Film Award for Best Dialogue – Premada Kanike 1985–86 – Karnataka State Film Award for Best Screenplay – Bhagyada Lakshmi Baramma (Shared with Singeetam Srinivasa Rao)
 1986–87 – Karnataka State Film Award for Best Screenplay – Anand (Shared with Singeetam Srinivasa Rao)
 1992–93 – Karnataka State Film Award for Best Dialogue – Jeevana Chaitra'''

References

External links 
 

1934 births
1993 deaths
Kannada-language lyricists
Indian male songwriters
Film musicians from Karnataka
People from Hassan district
Screenwriters from Karnataka
20th-century Indian musicians
Indian male screenwriters
Kannada screenwriters
20th-century male musicians
20th-century Indian screenwriters
20th-century Indian male writers